Mercenary Revolt may refer to:

The Mercenary War (c. 240 BC) (also, Libyan War or Truceless War), an uprising of troops employed by Carthage at the end of the First Punic War
Irish and German Mercenary Soldiers' Revolt, in Rio de Janeiro in 1828 during the Cisplatine War
The Mercenaries' Mutinies in the Congo, 1966 and 1967